A Society Scandal is a 1924 American silent drama film directed by Allan Dwan, and starring Gloria Swanson and Rod La Rocque. Distributed by Paramount Pictures, the film is based on a 1922 play The Laughing Lady, by Alfred Sutro which starred Ethel Barrymore in 1923 on Broadway and originally in 1922 with Edith Evans in UK.<ref>[http://silentera.com/PSFL/data/S/SocietyScandal1924.html 'Progressive Silent Film List: 'A Society Scandal] at silentera.com</ref>

Paramount remade the story in 1929 as The Laughing Lady an early talkie for Ruth Chatterton.

Plot
As described in a film magazine review, Marjorie Colbert and her husband Hector disagree continually. She becomes compromised by an unconventional visit paid to her room by Harrison Peters. Hector sues and obtains a divorce, his success being due to the eloquent attack on Marjorie's reputation made by made by his lawyer, Daniel Farr. Marjorie plans a revenge on Daniel by vamping him and enticing him to her apartment, where she then screams for help. The lawyer's reputation suffers, but Marjorie suddenly repents of her scheme when she realizes that Daniel and her love each other. He forgives her and all ends well.

Cast

Preservation
With no copies of A Society Scandal'' located in any film archives, it is a lost film.

References

External links 

 
 
 Lobby poster
 Several posters
 Lobby card (archived)

1924 films
1924 drama films
Silent American drama films
American silent feature films
American black-and-white films
American films based on plays
Lost American films
Films directed by Allan Dwan
Paramount Pictures films
1924 lost films
Lost drama films
1920s American films